C. Y. Lee may refer to:

 Chin Yang Lee (1915–2018), Chinese-American writer
 Chu-Yuan Lee (born 1938), Taiwanese architect
 Lee Chung-yong (born 1988), South Korean footballer
 C. Y. Lee, inventor of the Lee algorithm